Rudolf Rupec (17 September 1895 or 17 November 1896 – 1 July 1983) was a Croatian footballer who played for the national teams of Austria and the Kingdom of Serbs, Croats and Slovenes. He also competed at the 1920 Summer Olympics and the 1924 Summer Olympics.

Club career
He began his career at SK Rapid Wien in 1911 and from 1913 to 1920 was on the club's first squad. In 1920 he joined a top Croatian side HŠK Građanski Zagreb. He played with the club until the end of his career in 1928. With the club he won the national championship of the Kingdom of Serbs, Croats and Slovenes in 1923 and 1926.

International career
During the waning years of the Austro-Hungarian Empire, Rupec played ten matches for the Austria national football team. Rupec was part of the Kingdom's first national team, and had 9 caps, scoring no goals. His final international was at a May 1924 Olympic Games match against Uruguay.

He later coached HAŠK Zagreb to the national championship in 1938. He died in the summer of 1983 at the age of 87 in Zagreb.

References

External links
 
 Profile at Serbian federation - date of birth 17.9.1895
 Profile at rapidarchiv - date of birth 17.11.1896
 Profile at FIFA - date of birth 17.11.1896
 National team data at RSSSF - date of birth 17.11.1896

1890s births
1983 deaths
People from Grubišno Polje
People from the Kingdom of Croatia-Slavonia
Association football defenders
Austrian footballers
Austria international footballers
Yugoslav footballers
Yugoslavia international footballers
Dual internationalists (football)
Olympic footballers of Yugoslavia
Footballers at the 1920 Summer Olympics
Footballers at the 1924 Summer Olympics
SK Rapid Wien players
HŠK Građanski Zagreb players
Yugoslav First League players
Yugoslav football managers
Sport in Bjelovar-Bilogora County